The 2018 United States House of Representatives elections in New York were held November 6, 2018 to elect a U.S. Representative from each of New York's 27 congressional districts. The elections coincided with the gubernatorial election, as well as an election to the United States Senate and various state and local elections.

Contested primaries were held June 26, 2018. On Election Day, Democrats gained three New York House seats, and the Democratic Party retook control of the House of Representatives. Democrats won a total of 21 New York House seats, while Republicans won six.

Overview
Elections were held in all 27 of New York's congressional districts in 2018. Prior to the 2018 elections, one New York House seat was vacant due to the death of Rep. Louise Slaughter (D-25th District) on March 16, 2018. In the June 26, 2018 Democratic primary in District 14, insurgent Alexandria Ocasio-Cortez upset longtime incumbent Rep. Joe Crowley. On November 6, 2018, the Democratic Party held the open seat in District 25 and defeated three Republican incumbents; with the exception of Crowley, all Democratic incumbent members of Congress in New York were re-elected. The defeated Republican incumbents were Rep. Dan Donovan (R-11th District) (defeated by Democrat Max Rose), Rep. John Faso (R-19th District) (defeated by Democrat Antonio Delgado), and Rep. Claudia Tenney (R-22nd District) (defeated by Democrat Anthony Brindisi. Incumbent Rep. Chris Collins (R-27th District) was narrowly re-elected despite having been arrested on insider trading charges in August 2018.

Democrats won a total of 21 New York House seats, while Republicans won six. Nationally, the Democratic Party won control of the House of Representatives on Election Day.

New York is near unique among the states in that it allows electoral fusion (cross-endorsement). As a result, New York ballots tend to list many political parties. Most news outlets report election results using only the primary affiliation of party registration of candidates rather than by the party nominees that get elected, and most pollsters group candidates the same way.

By district

Results of the 2018 United States House of Representatives elections in New York by district:

District 1

The 1st district is located in eastern Long Island and includes most of central and eastern Suffolk County. The incumbent was Republican Lee Zeldin, who had represented the district since 2015. He was re-elected to a second term with 58% of the vote in 2016.

Democratic primary
The 1st district was included on the initial list of Republican-held seats being targeted by the Democratic Congressional Campaign Committee in 2018.

Candidates
Declared
 Kate Browning, Suffolk County Legislator
 Elaine DiMasi, physicist
 Perry Gershon, businessman
 Vivian Viloria-Fisher, former Suffolk County Legislator and candidate for Brookhaven Town Supervisor in 2013
 David Pechefsky, New York City Council staffer

Withdrew
 Brendon Henry, bartender
 Hannah Selinger, writer and sommelier

Declined
 Dave Calone, venture capitalist, former chairman of the Suffolk Planning Commission and candidate in 2016
 Fred Thiele, state assemblyman

Results

Republican primary
Lee Zeldin, incumbent

General election
In mid-September, Gershon said his campaign had raised more than $1.25 million since July 1, with contributions averaging $85. At the end of September, the nonpartisan Washington, D.C.-based Cook Political Report rated the race as "Likely Republican;" the "Likely" designation is for seats "not considered competitive at this point, but hav[ing] the potential to become engaged."

Endorsements

Polling

Results

District 2

The 2nd district is based along the South Shore of Long Island and includes southwestern Suffolk County and a small portion of southeastern Nassau County. The incumbent was Republican Peter T. King, who had represented the district since 2013 and previously represented the 3rd district from 1993 to 2013. He was re-elected to a thirteenth term with 62% of the vote in 2016.

Democratic primary

Candidates
Liuba Grechen Shirley, teacher
DuWayne Gregory, Suffolk County legislator

Results

Republican primary
Peter King, incumbent

General election

Endorsements

Results

District 3

The 3rd district includes most of the North Shore of Long Island. It covers northwestern Suffolk County, northern Nassau County, and northeastern Queens. The incumbent was Democrat Tom Suozzi, who had represented the district since 2017. He was elected to replace retiring Representative Steve Israel with 53% of the vote in 2016. New York's 3rd district was included on the initial list of Democrat-held seats being targeted by the National Republican Congressional Committee in 2018.

Democratic primary
Tom Suozzi, incumbent

Republican primary
Dan DeBono, investment banker

Independents
Joshua Sauberman, policy analyst

General election

Endorsements

Results

District 4

The 4th district is located in central and southern Nassau County. The incumbent was Democrat Kathleen Rice, who had represented the district since 2015. She was re-elected to a second term with 59.5% of the vote in 2016.

Democratic primary
 Kathleen Rice, incumbent

Republican primary
Ameer Benno, attorney

General election

Endorsements

Results

District 5

The 5th district is mostly located within Queens in New York City, but also includes a small portion of Nassau County. The incumbent was Democrat Gregory Meeks, who had represented the district since 2013 and previously represented the 6th district from 1998 to 2013. He was re-elected to a tenth term with 85% of the vote in 2016.

Democratic primary

Candidates
 Gregory Meeks, incumbent
 Mizan Choudhury, IT operations manager
 Carl Achille, former vice president of the Elmont Chamber of Commerce

Results

General election

Endorsements

Results

District 6

The 6th district is located entirely within Queens in New York City. The incumbent was Democrat Grace Meng, who had represented the district since 2013. She was re-elected to a third term with 72% of the vote in 2016.

Democratic primary
Grace Meng, incumbent

General election

Results

District 7

The 7th district is located entirely in New York City and includes parts of Brooklyn, Queens, and Manhattan. The incumbent was Democrat Nydia Velázquez, who had represented the district since 2013 and previously represented the 12th district from 1993 to 2013. She was re-elected to a thirteenth term with 91% of the vote in 2016.

Democratic primary
Nydia Velázquez, incumbent

General election

Endorsements

Results

District 8

The 8th district is located entirely in the New York City boroughs of Brooklyn and Queens. The incumbent was Democrat Hakeem Jeffries, who had represented the district since 2013.  He was re-elected to a third term with 93% of the vote in 2016.

Democratic primary

Results
Hakeem Jeffries, incumbent

General election

Results

District 9

The 9th district is located entirely within the New York City borough of Brooklyn. The incumbent was Democrat Yvette Clarke, who had represented the district since 2013 and previously represented the 11th district from 2007 to 2013. She was re-elected to a sixth term with 92% of the vote in 2016.

Democratic primary

Results

Republican primary
Lutchi Gayot, businessman

General election

Results

District 10

The 10th district is located in New York City and includes the Upper West Side of Manhattan; the west side of Lower Manhattan, including Greenwich Village and the Financial District; and parts of Brooklyn, including Borough Park. The incumbent was Democrat Jerrold Nadler, who had represented the district since 2013 and previously represented the 8th district from 1993 to 2013 and the 17th district from 1992 to 1993. He was re-elected to a thirteenth full term with 78% of the vote in 2016.

Democratic primary
 Jerrold Nadler, incumbent

Republican primary
Naomi Levin, software engineer

General election

Endorsements

Results

District 11

The 11th district is located entirely in New York City and includes all of Staten Island and parts of southern Brooklyn. The incumbent was Republican Dan Donovan, who had represented the district since 2015.  He was re-elected to a second term with 62% of the vote in 2016.

Democratic primary
New York's 11th district was included on the initial list of Republican-held seats being targeted by the Democratic Congressional Campaign Committee in 2018.

Candidates
Declared
 Michael DeVito, retired Marine Staff Sergeant
 Zach Emig, bond trader
 Max Rose, army veteran and chief of staff at Brightpoint Health
 Paul Sperling, entrepreneur

Withdrew
 Boyd Melson, retired boxer and Army Reserves Captain
 Mike DeCillis, teacher and retired police officer (endorsed Michael DeVito)

Endorsements

Results

Republican primary
Former Congressman Michael Grimm, who resigned in 2014 after pleading guilty to federal tax fraud charges for which he served eight months in prison, challenged Donovan in the primary.

Endorsements

Polling

Results

Conservative primary
Dan Donovan, the incumbent Congressman, also ran in the primary for the Conservative Party of New York State.

Results

General election

Polling

Results

District 12

The 12th district is located entirely in New York City and includes several neighborhoods in the East Side of Manhattan, Greenpoint and western Queens. The incumbent was Democrat Carolyn Maloney, who had represented the district since 2013 and previously represented the 14th district from 1993 to 2013. She was re-elected to a thirteenth term with 83% of the vote in 2016.

Democratic primary

Results

Republican primary
Eliot Rabin, businessman

General election

Results

District 13

The 13th district is located entirely in New York City and includes Upper Manhattan and a small portion of the western Bronx. The incumbent was Democrat Adriano Espaillat, who had represented the district since 2017. He was elected to replace retiring Representative Charles Rangel with 89% of the vote in 2016.

Democratic primary
 Adriano Espaillat, incumbent

Republican primary
Jineea Butler, hip hop analyst

General election

Results

District 14

The 14th district is located in New York City and includes the eastern Bronx and part of north-central Queens. The incumbent was Democrat Joseph Crowley, a leader of the New Democrat Coalition, who had represented the district since 2013. Crowley previously represented the 7th district from 1999 to 2013. He was re-elected to a tenth term with 83% of the vote in 2016. Crowley, who had been named as a potential successor to Nancy Pelosi as House Leader or Speaker, sought re-election in 2018.

Democratic primary
Backed by the organization Brand New Congress, bartender and activist Alexandria Ocasio-Cortez challenged Crowley in the primary, announcing her campaign in June 2017. Ocasio-Cortez, who had been an organizer in Bernie Sanders' 2016 presidential campaign, was the first primary challenger Crowley had faced since 2004. On May 10, 2018, it was announced that she had gathered enough signatures to appear on the primary ballot. Despite this, most observers concluded that Crowley would win the primary, citing his strong support from elected officials and his large fundraising advantage. 

In her campaign, Ocasio-Cortez claimed that Crowley was not progressive enough for the district, and also accused him of corruption, stating that he was using his position as chair of the Queens Democratic Party improperly. She aggressively built a presence on social media platforms, creating a biographical video promoting her campaign that went viral. Crowley significantly outspent Ocasio-Cortez prior to the primary election.

Candidates 
Joe Crowley, incumbent U.S. Representative
Alexandria Ocasio-Cortez, bartender and activist

Debates

Endorsements

Results
Ocasio-Cortez defeated Crowley in the Democratic primary election, which was considered an upset victory.

Republican primary
Anthony Pappas, St. John's University economics and finance associate professor

General election
Following his defeat in the Democratic primary, Crowley remained on the ballot on the Working Families Party line, but did not actively campaign. Following Ocasio-Cortez's primary win, Joann Ariola, chairwoman of the Queens Republican Party, claimed that the Republican Party had a chance of winning the seat due to Ocasio-Cortez being a democratic socialist. Michael Rendino, chairman of the Bronx Republican Party, was more skeptical, declaring that "even if Crowley and Ocasio-Cortez split the vote, we'd still lose 2-to-one".

Professor Anthony Pappas was the Republican nominee, but was disavowed by the Queens and Bronx Republican Parties after he was accused of committing domestic violence. Several Republicans approached both the Queens and Bronx Republican parties with the intent of replacing Pappas on the ballot, but Pappas refused to withdraw from the race. Pappas's campaign was based around the abolition of judicial immunity, which he argued had led to judges becoming unaccountable for their actions. Pappas's campaign manager attempted to convince him to run an aggressive campaign against Ocasio-Cortez, but he refused.

Endorsements

Results

District 15

The 15th district is located entirely within The Bronx in New York City and is one of the smallest districts by area in the entire country. The incumbent was Democrat José E. Serrano, who had represented the district since 2013, and previously represented the 16th district from 1993 to 2013 and the 18th district from 1990 to 1993. He was re-elected to a fourteenth full term with 95% of the vote in 2016.

Democratic primary
 José Serrano, incumbent

Republican primary
Jason Gonzalez

Withdrawn

Reform primary
Alexandria Ocasio-Cortez (write-in) (declined nomination)

General election

Results

District 16

The 16th district is located in the northern part of The Bronx and the southern half of Westchester County, including the cities of Mount Vernon, Yonkers, New Rochelle, and Rye. The incumbent was Democrat Eliot Engel, who had represented the district since 2013 and previously represented the 17th district from 1993 to 2013 and the 19th district from 1989 to 1993. He was re-elected to a fifteenth term with 95% of the vote in 2016.

Democratic primary

Results

General election

Results

District 17

The 17th district contains all of Rockland County and the northern and central portions of Westchester County, including the cities of Peekskill and White Plains. The incumbent was Democrat Nita Lowey, who had represented the district since 2013 and previously represented the 18th district from 1993 to 2013 and the 20th district from 1989 to 1993. She was re-elected to a fifteenth term unopposed in 2016.

Democratic primary
Nita Lowey, incumbent

General election

Results

District 18

The 18th district is located entirely within the Hudson Valley, covering all of Orange County and Putnam County, as well as parts of southern Dutchess County and northeastern Westchester County. The incumbent was Democrat Sean Patrick Maloney, who had represented the district since 2013.  He was re-elected to a third term with 56% of the vote in 2016.

New York's 18th district has been included on the initial list of Democratic held seats being targeted by the National Republican Congressional Committee in 2018.

Democratic primary
 Sean Patrick Maloney, incumbent

Republican primary
James O'Donnell, Orange County legislator

General election

Debates
Complete video of debate, October 23, 2018

Endorsements

Results

District 19

The 19th district is located in New York's Hudson Valley and Catskills regions and includes all of Columbia, Delaware, Greene, Otsego, Schoharie, Sullivan and Ulster counties, and parts of Broome, Dutchess, Montgomery and Rensselaer counties. The incumbent was Republican John Faso, who had represented the district since 2017. He was elected to replace retiring Representative Chris Gibson with 54% of the vote in 2016. The Democratic nominee was Antonio Delgado. Actress Diane Neal ran under the newly created Friends of Diane Neal ballot line.

Democratic primary 
New York's 19th district was included on the initial list of Republican-held seats being targeted by the Democratic Congressional Campaign Committee in 2018.

Candidates 
Declared
 Jeff Beals, teacher and former U.S. diplomat
 David Clegg, lawyer
 Antonio Delgado, attorney
 Brian Flynn, businessman
 Pat Ryan, Iraq War veteran and businessman
 Gareth Rhodes, former gubernatorial aide
 Erin Collier, economist

Declined
 Mike Hein, Ulster County Executive
 Zephyr Teachout, candidate for governor in 2014 and nominee for this seat in 2016
 Will Yandik, Livingston Deputy Supervisor and candidate for this seat in 2016
Withdrew
 Sue Sullivan, strategic planning consultant

Polling

Results

Republican primary
John Faso, incumbent

Independent candidates
Declared
Diane Neal, actress

Disqualified
Dal LaMagna, businessman

General election

Debates
Complete video of debate, October 19, 2018

Endorsements

Polling

Results

District 20

The 20th district is located in the Capital District and includes all of Albany and Schenectady Counties, and portions of Montgomery, Rensselaer and Saratoga Counties. The incumbent was Democrat Paul Tonko, who had represented the district since 2013 and previously represented the 21st district from 2009 to 2013.  He was re-elected to a fifth term with 68% of the vote in 2016.

Democratic primary
Paul Tonko, incumbent

Republican primary
Joe Vitollo, nurse and Republican nominee in 2016

General election

Endorsements

Results

District 21

The 21st district, the state's largest and most rural congressional district, includes most of the North Country and the northern suburbs of Syracuse. The district borders Vermont to the east. The incumbent was Republican Elise Stefanik, who had represented the district since 2015.  She was re-elected to a second term with 65% of the vote in 2016.

Democratic primary

Candidates
Declared
 Don Boyajian, attorney and former congressional aide
 Tedra Cobb, former St. Lawrence County legislator
 Emily Martz, economic development adviser
 Patrick Nelson, biochemist, campaign director for Democratic nominee Mike Derrick in 2016, candidate for Stillwater Town Board in 2015
 Dylan Ratigan, businessman, author, film producer, The Young Turks political commentator and former MSNBC host
 Katie Wilson, antiques store owner

Potential
 Mike Derrick, retired Army Colonel and nominee in 2016
 Martha Devaney
 Dylan Hewitt, project consultant for the Clinton Foundation
 Aaron Woolf, filmmaker and nominee in 2014

Results

Republican primary
Farmer and real estate broker Russ Finley planned on making a primary challenge of Stefanik, but later withdrew from the race, leaving Stefanik unopposed in the primary.

Elise Stefanik, incumbent

Green primary
Past Green Party nominee Matt Funiciello announced that he would not run in 2018. Lynn Kahn was the Green Party candidate in 2018.

General election

Endorsements

Polling

Results

District 22

The 22nd district is located in Central New York and includes all of Chenango, Cortland, Madison and Oneida counties, and parts of Broome, Herkimer, Oswego and Tioga counties.  The incumbent was Republican Claudia Tenney, who had represented the district since 2017. She was elected to replace retiring Representative Richard Hanna with 47% of the vote in 2016.

New York's 22nd district was included on the initial list of Republican-held seats being targeted by the Democratic Congressional Campaign Committee in 2018.

Democratic primary
Anthony Brindisi, state assemblyman

Republican primary
 Claudia Tenney, incumbent

General election

Endorsements

Polling

Results

District 23

The 23rd district includes all of Allegany, Cattaraugus, Chautauqua, Chemung, Schuyler, Seneca, Steuben, Tompkins and Yates counties, along with parts of Ontario and Tioga counties. The incumbent was Republican Tom Reed, who had represented the district since 2013 and previously represented the 29th district from 2009 to 2013. He was re-elected to a fifth term with 58% of the vote in 2016.

Democratic primary

Candidates
Declared
 Max Della Pia, retired air force officer
 Ian Golden, businessman
 Tracy Mitrano, Interim Director of the Executive Master's Program of the Park School of Communications at Ithaca College
 Eddie Sundquist, attorney

Declined
 Jason Leifer, Dryden Town Supervisor
 John F. Plumb, nominee in 2016

Results
Although Della Pia finished slightly ahead of the other candidates on primary election night, he conceded to Mitrano after absentee ballots were counted.

Republican primary
Tom Reed, incumbent

Women's Equality primary
Tracy Mitrano, who also ran in the Democratic primary, ran unopposed for the Women's Equality Party nomination.

Results

General election

Endorsements

Polling

Results

District 24

The 24th district includes all of Cayuga, Onondaga and Wayne counties, and the western part of Oswego County. The incumbent was Republican John Katko, who had represented the district since 2015.  He was re-elected to a second term with 61% of the vote in 2016.

Democratic primary
New York's 24th district was included on the initial list of Republican-held seats being targeted by the Democratic Congressional Campaign Committee in 2018.

Candidates
Declared
 Dana Balter, Syracuse University professor
 Juanita Perez Williams, former Syracuse mayoral candidate

Declined
 Eric Kingson, professor and candidate in 2016
 Phil LaTessa, former Syracuse City Auditor
 Steve Michaels, attorney
 Chris Ryan, Onondaga County Legislator
 Steve Williams, attorney and candidate in 2016
 Stephanie Miner, Mayor of Syracuse

Polling

Results

Republican primary
John Katko, incumbent

General election

Endorsements

Polling

Results

District 25

The 25th district is located entirely within Monroe County, centered on the city of Rochester. The seat was vacant due to the March 2018 death of incumbent Democratic Representative Louise Slaughter, who represented the district from 2013 to 2018 and previously represented the 28th district from 1993 to 2013 and the 30th district from 1987 to 1993.

Following precedent set in 2010, two concurrent elections were held in November 2018. One election was held to fill the seat for the 2018 lame-duck session, and another was held to fill the seat for the 2019–2020 term.

Democratic primary

Candidates
Declared
 Adam McFadden, Rochester City Council member
 Joseph Morelle, New York State Assembly Majority Leader
 Robin Wilt, Brighton town board member
 Rachel Barnhart, former television journalist

Withdrew
 Andrew Gilchrist, teacher

Results

Republican primary
Jim Maxwell, neurosurgeon

General election

Endorsements

Polling

Results

District 26

The 26th district is located in Erie and Niagara counties and includes the cities of Buffalo and Niagara Falls. The incumbent was Democrat Brian Higgins, who had represented the district since 2013, and previously represented the 27th district from 2005 to 2013. He was re-elected to a seventh term with 75% of the vote in 2016.

Democratic primary
Brian Higgins, incumbent

Republican primary
Renee Zeno, businesswoman

General election

Results

District 27

The 27th district is located in Western New York and includes all of Orleans, Genesee, Wyoming and Livingston counties, and parts of Erie, Monroe, Niagara and Ontario counties.

On August 11, 2018, incumbent Republican Chris Collins, who had represented the district since 2013 and was re-elected to a third term with 67% of the vote in 2016, announced that he would withdraw from his re-election campaign after being arrested for insider trading. Removing himself from the ballot would have required Collins to be nominated as a dummy candidate in another election or to move his legal place of residence out of state (he has additional homes in Florida and the District of Columbia). On September 17, 2018, Collins announced that he had changed course and would campaign for re-election in November after all.

Democratic primary
New York's 27th district was included on the initial list of Republican-held seats being targeted by the Democratic Congressional Campaign Committee in 2018.

Candidates
Nominee
Nate McMurray, Supervisor of Grand Island

Withdrew
 Erin Cole, U.S. Army veteran, former senior vice president of Global NY
 Sean Bunny, prosecutor
 Nick Stankevich, businessman

Republican primary

Candidates
Nominee
 Chris Collins, incumbent
Withdrew
 Frank C. Smierciak II, medical payment worker
 Larry Piegza, computer technician and entrepreneur, remains in election as nominee of the Reform Party

Republican post-primary
Potential
Following Collins's August 11 announcement that he would withdraw from the race, as many as 20 candidates expressed interest in the Republican nomination. (Collins later changed course and opted to seek re-election.) Among them were the following:
 David Bellavia, Iraq War veteran and radio host
 Lynne Dixon, Erie County Legislator
 Patrick M. Gallivan, state senator
 Stephen Hawley, state assemblyman
 Chris Jacobs, state senator and former New York Secretary of State
 Stefan Mychajliw, Erie County Comptroller
 Robert Ortt, state senator
 Carl Paladino, 2010 gubernatorial nominee, former member of the Buffalo Public Schools Board of Education and founder of Ellicott Development Co.
 Michael Ranzenhofer, state senator
 Ed Rath, Erie County Legislator
 Ray Walter, state assemblyman

General election

Polling

With Jacobs

With Mychajliw

With Ortt

With Paladino

Endorsements

Results

Notes

References

External links
Candidates at Vote Smart
Candidates at Ballotpedia
Campaign finance at FEC
Campaign finance at OpenSecrets

2018
New York
United States House of Representatives